WDLA (1270 kHz) is an AM radio station broadcasting a news/talk format. Licensed to Walton, New York, United States, the station is owned by Townsquare Media. It has programming from Fox News Radio, NBC News Radio, Compass Media Networks, Premiere Networks, Radio America, and Westwood One.

References

External links

DLA (AM)
Townsquare Media radio stations